The St. Catharines Armoury is a Recognized Federal Heritage Building in St. Catharines, Ontario, Canada. The building is currently used by the Canadian Armed Forces as a drill hall. It was built in 1905 to replace a previous drill-shed that was destroyed by an 1898 tornado. It served as the headquarters for the 10th Battery of the 56th Field Regiment. Before being paved over for use as a parking lot, grass outside the building was used for military drills. The interior of the building has been used for local gatherings and events, such as a 1907 exihibition by the St. Catharines Horticultural Society.

See also 
 Downtown St. Catharines
 List of Canadian tornadoes and tornado outbreaks

References

External links 
 History from Here: The Lake Street Armoury at 81 Lake Street

Buildings and structures in St. Catharines
Historic buildings and structures in Canada
Canadian Armed Forces